Yellow Creek is a  tributary of the White River in Rio Blanco County, Colorado.

See also
 List of rivers of Colorado
 List of tributaries of the Colorado River

References

Rivers of Colorado
Rivers of Rio Blanco County, Colorado
Tributaries of the Green River (Colorado River tributary)
Tributaries of the Colorado River in Colorado